Police science is the study and research which deals with police work. Studies and research in criminology, forensic science, psychiatry, psychology, jurisprudence, community policing, criminal justice, correctional administration and penology all come under this umbrella term 'police science'. It thus includes physical and social sciences.

By country

United Kingdom
UK has developed the Police National Computer as a sophisticated intelligence tool that holds extensive data on criminals, vehicles and property, and accessible in a matter of seconds through over 30,000 terminals across the country.

PITO reports that a national fingerprint and DNA database has been developed containing over 3.4 million DNA profiles providing the police with an average of 3,000 matches a month. In 2004-5 there were over 40,000 matches.

The police use a wide range of technologies to curb road traffic offences like speeding and drunk driving including breathalyser devices, bus lane enforcement cameras, immobilisation devices, light signals devices and speed measuring devices.

Bangladesh

A department of Criminology and Police Science (CPS) has launched in 2003 at Mawlana Bhashani Science and Technology University.

See also 
Crime science
Polizeiwissenschaft

References

External links
UK moots a 5-year S&T Strategy (pdf)

Law enforcement theory